Miss Navajo is a 2007 independent documentary film directed by Billy Luther. It follows 21-year-old Crystal Frazier who, alongside six other Navajo women, competes in a beauty pageant for the title of Miss Navajo Nation 2005–2006.

Summary 
21-year-old Crystal Frazier lives with her family on a farm near Table Mesa, New Mexico, having recently decided to enter the Miss Navajo Nation pageant, although is initially sceptical of her chances of winning. Crystal becomes more serious about her participation in the contest when she realises that, unlike typical American beauty pageants, the competition promotes the Navajo Nation, with the winner representing the culture and serving as a role model and spokesperson for the language and traditions of the Navajo people.

The competition is held over five days at the Navajo Nation Fair, consisting of several categories testing the contestants on their Navajo knowledge and skills. The entry criteria are that all contestants must be over eighteen years old, have graduated high school, and speak the Navajo language. The contestants are tested on their knowledge about Navajo government, history, and contemporary issues including substance misuse on reservations and the role of women; their comprehension of the Navajo language; sheep butchering; and tortilla making. Each contestant also has to demonstrate one modern-day and one traditional skill or talent.

Crystal ultimately places as runner-up. A year later, she speaks about how taking part in the Miss Navajo Nation contest allowed her to meet other people and think about the responsibility, courage and leadership expected of her as a Navajo woman.

References

External links 
 Official Website
 
 
 Miss Navajo – 32nd American Indian Film Festival

2007 drama films
2007 films
American independent films
Documentary films about Arizona
Navajo-language films
Documentary films about Native Americans
Films set in Arizona
Films set on the Navajo Nation
2007 documentary films
2000s English-language films
2000s American films
2007 independent films
2007 multilingual films
American multilingual films
Documentary films about New Mexico
Documentary films about women in the United States